Tuji Grm (in older sources also Ptuj Grm) is a dispersed settlement in the hills south of the Sava River east of the capital Ljubljana in central Slovenia. It belongs to the City Municipality of Ljubljana. The area is part of the traditional region of Lower Carniola. It is now included with the rest of the municipality in the Central Slovenia Statistical Region.

History
A prehistoric fortress stood west of the village on Mance Peak (747 m). This may have also been the site of Turner Castle, no trace of which remains today. During the Second World War there was an engagement between the Partisans and German forces at Tuji Grm on 22 May 1942. On 27 October 1944 German forces burned the village.

References

External links
Tuji Grm on Geopedia

Populated places in the City Municipality of Ljubljana
Sostro District